Implicit may refer to:

Mathematics
 Implicit function
 Implicit function theorem
 Implicit curve
 Implicit surface
 Implicit differential equation

Other uses
 Implicit assumption, in logic
 Implicit-association test, in social psychology
 Implicit bit, in floating-point arithmetic
 Implicit learning, in learning psychology
 Implicit memory, in long-term human memory
 Implicit solvation, in computational chemistry
 Implicit stereotype (implicit bias), in social identity theory
 Implicit type conversion, in computing

See also
 Implicit and explicit atheism, types of atheism coined by George H. Smith
 Implication (disambiguation)
 Implicature